The Ompompanoosuc River  is a river, about 25 mi (40 km) long, in eastern Vermont in the United States. It is a tributary of the Connecticut River, which flows to Long Island Sound. According to the Geographic Names Information System, the river has also been known by the names "Om-pom-pa-noos-uc" and "Pompanoosuc."

The Ompompanoosuc River rises in eastern Orange County in the town of Vershire, and flows generally southwardly through the towns of West Fairlee and Thetford into northeastern Windsor County, where it joins the Connecticut River in the village of Pompanoosuc which is located in the town of Norwich.

In Thetford, the river is dammed by the Union Village Dam, which was built from 1946 to 1950 as part of a U.S. Army Corps of Engineers project for flood control. The structure is a 170-foot-high earthen dam, creating a seasonal lake in the winter.

The West Branch Ompompanoosuc River flows generally southeastwardly through the towns of Vershire and Strafford to Thetford, where it joins the main stem of the river.

See also 
 List of Vermont rivers

References 

Rivers of Vermont
Rivers of Orange County, Vermont
Rivers of Windsor County, Vermont
Tributaries of the Connecticut River
United States Army Corps of Engineers dams
Dams completed in 1950
Vermont placenames of Native American origin